Rui Manuel Lima Correia Palhares (born 4 November 1954 in Évora) is a retired Portuguese footballer who played as a left midfielder.

External links

1954 births
Living people
People from Évora
Portuguese footballers
Association football midfielders
Primeira Liga players
Sporting CP footballers
Vitória F.C. players
Varzim S.C. players
Boavista F.C. players
S.C. Braga players
C.F. Estrela da Amadora players
Portugal international footballers
Sportspeople from Évora District